The Foster-Fair House is a historic two-story house in Louisville, Mississippi. It was 
built in 1842 by Samuel Washington Smyth. It was acquired by Dr. Edward Foster, a settler and physician who was related to Vice President John C. Calhoun, in 1852.

The property was designed as an I-house, with Greek Revival features. It has been listed on the National Register of Historic Places since November 29, 2000.

References

Houses completed in 1842
I-houses in Mississippi
Houses on the National Register of Historic Places in Mississippi
National Register of Historic Places in Winston County, Mississippi